The Kow Swamp archaeological site comprises a series of late Pleistocene burials within the lunette of the eastern rim of a former lake known as Kow Swamp (north-central Victoria, Australia). The site is significant for archaeological excavations by Alan Thorne between 1968 and 1972 which recovered the partial skeletal remains of more than 22 individuals.

Locality
The name of Kow Swamp is  derived from an Aboriginal word in the Yorta Yorta language, (Ghow), which refers to the white gypsum soil found in the area. Originally a low lying swamp, it was filled when the Murray River is in flood or running at high levels, while Bendigo creek provides a smaller amount of water.

Discovery

There is evidence of recent Aboriginal occupation of the area from canoe trees and middens, while early settlers' records describe an Aboriginal ceremonial site on the north side of the swamp. The most notable evidence was the discovery in 1925, on the west side of the swamp, of the Cohuna Cranium by a local earthmoving contractor. The editor of the local newspaper Cohuna Farmers Weekly notified authorities and the significance of the discovery was realised. In the 1960s, Alan Thorne also identified archaic bone from the collection at the Museum of Victoria, and traced the find spot to Kow Swamp. Archaeological excavations were undertaken between 1968 and 1972 by Thorne for the Australian National University in Canberra. Further remains were found around the swamp by an interested local resident, Gordon Spark. By 1972 the remains of at least forty individuals had been excavated and studied. These discoveries helped establish the diversity of Aboriginal genetic history and have been interpreted as representing different waves of immigrants to Australia before European discovery.

Dating

Radiocarbon dates returned a wide range of ages for the burials, with 13,000 ± 280 (ANU1236) from shell in the grave of KS5 and 10,070 ± 250 (ANU-403b), from bone apatite from KS10 respectively. The youngest date was approximately 6500 BP for KS1.

Optically stimulated luminescence (OSL) dating was undertaken of the Kow Swamp burial site in 2003 (close to KS 9, the only burial excavated in situ), which suggested that the cemetery was in use between 22 and 19 ka, rather than 15 – 9 ka. Some question the OSL dates due to the difficulty of ensuring that the dated sand is contemporary with the actual burials. However, the OSL dates from the burial units directly contradict the C14 dates, which were only ever minimum ages because of contamination by younger carbon.

Description of remains

The initial descriptions of the crania from Kow Swamp identified "receding frontal squama, massive supraorbital regions and a supraglabella fossae..." which were considered to be "preserving an almost unmodified eastern erectus form" displaying a "..complex of archaic characteristics not seen in recent Aboriginal crania...". The features were considered to indicate "the survival of Homo erectus features in Australia until as recently as 10,000 years ago". 
However, Donald Brothwell disputed this interpretation suggesting the vault size and shape at Kow Swamp had been influenced by artificial cranial deformation, particularly in Kow Swamp 5.

The varying morphological and metrical comparisons of the burials have distinguished them from modern Aboriginal crania and also a more gracile group of Pleistocene remains found at Lake Mungo and Keilor. These differences have been used to postulate separate arrivals of distinct groups of people. However, more recent comparison does not support Thorne's dual Pleistocene population model.

Repatriation

Following a campaign by Aboriginal community groups to have human remains repatriated from Australian and overseas museum collections, the Kow Swamp skeletons were returned to the area and re-interred. Casts of some of the Kow Swamp crania and mandibles are held by the Archaeology and Human Sciences department at the Australian National University, with some casts (including casts of KS1 and 5) being sent to the London Natural History Museum and other institutions. Despite extensive reconstruction, the Kow Swamp material was extremely fragmentary, with only two of the crania, KS1 and 5, being relatively complete.

See also

Multiregional origin of modern humans
Lake Mungo remains

Notes

References
 Brothwell, D. 1975. Possible evidence of a cultural practise affecting head growth in some late Pleistocene East Asian and Australasian populations. Journal of Archaeological Science 2:75-77.
 Brown, P. 1981. Artificial cranial deformation: a component in the variation in Pleistocene Australian Aboriginal crania. Archaeology in Oceania 16:156-167.
 Brown, P. 1987. Pleistocene homogeneity and Holocene size reduction: the Australian human skeletal evidence. Archaeology in Oceania 22:41-71.
 Brown, P. 1989. Coobool Creek: A morphological and metrical analysis of the crania, mandibles and dentitions of a prehistoric Australian human population. Terra Australis 13. Department of Prehistory, Australian National University, Canberra.
 Brown, P. 1995. Still flawed: a reply to Pardoe (1994) and Sim and Thorne (1994). Australian Archaeology 41:26-29.
 Pardoe, C. 1991. Competing paradigms and ancient human remains: the state of the discipline. Archaeology in Oceania 26:79-85.
 
 Pietrusewsky, M. 1979. Craniometric variation in Pleistocene Australian and more recent Australian and New Guinean populations studied by multivariate procedures. Occasional papers in human biology 2:83-123.
 Stone T, and Cupper ML (2003) Last Glacial Maximum ages for robust humans at Kow Swamp, southern Australia. Journal of Human Evolution 45:1-13.
 Thorne, A. G. 1975. Kow Swamp and Lake Mungo. Unpublished Ph.D. thesis, University of Sydney.
 Thorne, A. G. 1976. Morphological contrasts in Pleistocene Australians. In R. L. Kirk and A. G. Thorne (eds.), The Origin of the Australians, pp. 95–112. Australian * Institute of Aboriginal Studies, Canberra.
 Thorne, A. G. 1977. Separation or reconciliation? Biological clues to the development of Australian. In J. Allen, J. Golson and R. Jones (eds.), Sunda and Sahul, pp. 187–204. Academic Press, London.
 Thorne, A. G. and Macumber, P. G. 1972. Discoveries of Late Pleistocene man at Kow Swamp. Nature 238:316-319.
 Thorne, A. G. and Wilson, S. R. 1977. Pleistocene and recent Australians: a multivariate comparison. Journal of Human Evolution 6:393-402.

Archaeological sites in Victoria (Australia)